Los Vaqueros: Wild Wild Mixes is a remix album by Wisin & Yandel, accompanied by the WY Records staff, released on July 24, 2007. It is a remix edition of the compilation album Los Vaqueros.

Album details
The CD and DVD includes 21 songs, and two new versions of "Yo Te Quiero" by Wisin & Yandel, one with Jayko. There are a few special guests on this album like Don Omar, Yomo, Elephant Man, Luis Fonsi, Ken-Y & Hector "El Father". El Tío, who was on the first Los Vaqueros album, does not appear on this one, as he had left WY Records.

Track listing

Notes
 Jayko's lyrics from his song "Perdido" were used in a remix of Nelly Furtado's "Say It Right."

Chart performance

References

Wisin & Yandel albums
2007 remix albums
2007 compilation albums